Copsale is a hamlet in the civil parish of Nuthurst, and the Horsham District of West Sussex, England.

External links
 

Horsham District
Villages in West Sussex